faTT deX (Leonardo Esposito) is an Australian DJ. His single "Jus' Funkin" was nominated for the ARIA Award for Best Dance Release in 1999 and reached #65 on the ARIA singles chart.

Discography

Singles

Awards

ARIA Music Awards
The ARIA Music Awards is an annual awards ceremony that recognises excellence, innovation, and achievement across all genres of Australian music. They commenced in 1987. Fatt Dex was nominated for one award.

|-
| 1999
| "Jus' Funkin"
| ARIA Award for Best Dance Release
| 
|-

References

Living people
Year of birth missing (living people)